Evandro da Silva (born 14 January 1997), simply known as Evandro, is a Brazilian professional footballer who plays as a winger for Radnički 1923 Kragujevac in the Serbian SuperLiga.

Career
Evandro began his career at Coritiba. He made his competitive debut for the club against Corinthians on 26 July 2015, where he came on as a 46th-minute substitute for Leandro Silva and scored goal in the 2nd minute of stoppage time for a 1–1 home draw. Evandro signed with Bulgarian club CSKA Sofia in July 2018, remaining with the team for two years.

Career statistics

References

External links

1997 births
Sportspeople from Alagoas
Living people
Brazilian footballers
Association football forwards
Campeonato Brasileiro Série A players
Campeonato Brasileiro Série D players
First Professional Football League (Bulgaria) players
Nemzeti Bajnokság I players
Serbian SuperLiga players
Coritiba Foot Ball Club players
Red Bull Brasil players
PFC CSKA Sofia players
Fehérvár FC players
FK Proleter Novi Sad players
Brazilian expatriate footballers
Expatriate footballers in Bulgaria
Expatriate footballers in Hungary
Expatriate footballers in Serbia
Brazilian expatriate sportspeople in Bulgaria
Brazilian expatriate sportspeople in Hungary
Brazilian expatriate sportspeople in Serbia